Peer Muchalla is a town in Municipal Council Zirakpur in district Mohali in state of Punjab in India. It adjoins Sector 20 of Panchkula. Proximity to Chandigarh, Mohali, Panchkula and Airport is attracting property builders to this area. 
It is coming up as a posh area and developed suburb of Zirakpur and Panchkula with many multi-storey residential complexes. 

Main residential complexes are Friends Enclave, Metro Town, Motia Blue Ridge, Motia Huys, Euforia Homes, Imperial Garden, Bollywood Heights (1 and 2), Victoria Heights, Chinar Heights, Vrindavan Garden, Royale Empire, Royale Mansion, Panchkula Heights, Shree Shyam Residency, Imperial Residency, Platinum Tower, Millenium Garden, Royal Estate, Exotic Heights, Victoria Heights, Rehmat Homes amongst all. Many residential complexes are under construction. It has its own markets catering to the needs of the local residents' basic needs.

One building named Tricity Plaza is a mall and houses commercial establishments, many other malls including Trishla Little India, Panchkula Shopping Complex, Motia Pacific Centre are coming up and the area is rapidly developing. Over the last few years, the retail sector has been expanding rapidly and the growth has been very impressive. A commercial project named Promenade was also conceived to add and expand the market even further, and to meet the needs of all the residents. 

It being at just 500 meters distance from sector 20 Panchkula is very rapidly becoming a densely populated town. The rate of the property, as well as rent of flats, is relatively cheaper as compared to that in Sector 20 Panchkula and the quality of flats is much better than those in the nearby areas. Peer Muchalla and the Kishanpura area of Zirakpur are seeing rapid development being nearest to planned townships of HUDA and GMADA Aerocity respectively.

References

Mohali
Villages in Sahibzada Ajit Singh Nagar district